The Church of All Saints is the parish church in the village of Darfield in South Yorkshire, England. It is a Church of England church in the Diocese of Sheffield. The Corn Law repeal campaigner Ebenezer Elliot is buried in the churchyard which also contains monuments to the victims of the 1857 mining disaster at Lundhill Colliery and the 1886 disaster at Houghton Main Colliery. The 1886 memorial was restored in 2011. Between 1892 and 1934 the rector of All Saints was Canon Alfred Sorby who successfully argued in the High Court of Justice that on Ascension Day children attending a church service should not have to go to school. This ruling was known as the 'Darfield Judgement'.

See also
Grade I listed buildings in South Yorkshire
Listed buildings in Darfield, South Yorkshire

References

External links
 
 
 
 

Grade I listed churches in South Yorkshire
Church of England church buildings in South Yorkshire
11th-century church buildings in England